Slavovitsa may refer to the following places in Bulgaria:

 Slavovitsa, Pazardzhik Province, a village in the Septemvri Municipality
 Slavovitsa, Pleven Province, a village in Dolna Mitropoliya Municipality
 Slavovitsa, a race stage of the Rally Bulgaria